The Metropolitan West Side Elevated Railroad (known as the Met or Polly "L") was the third elevated rapid transit line to be built in Chicago, Illinois. It was the first of Chicago’s elevated lines to be electrically powered. The main line ran from downtown Chicago to Marshfield Avenue, with branches to Logan Square, Humboldt Park, Garfield Park, and Douglas Park (eventually extended to the suburb of Berwyn, Illinois). Portions of the system are still operated as sections of the Blue Line and the Pink Line.

Operation
At 6:00 am on May 7, 1895, the first train of the Metropolitan West Side Elevated left the Robey Street station bound for the downtown terminal at Canal.

Consolidation
In 1913, Chicago's four elevated railroad companies came together to form the Chicago Elevated Railways Collateral Trust establishing crosstown services for the first time. In 1924 all four companies were formally united to form the Chicago Rapid Transit Company. The Chicago Transit Authority took over the assets of the CRT in 1947. In 1951, the Logan Square branch was rerouted into the Milwaukee-Dearborn Subway, and the Humboldt Park Branch was cut back to a shuttle to Damen Avenue. The Humboldt Park branch would be discontinued a year later.

In 1952, the Douglas branch was shortened to its current terminal at 54th/Cermak and the Humboldt Park branch was closed. The construction of the Eisenhower Expressway (I-290) required the demolition of the Garfield Park branch and the Main Line but also called for a replacement rapid transit line in the median of the expressway. In 1958, the Garfield Park Branch was replaced by the new Congress Line. 

Much of the Metropolitan still operates today, with the Blue Line using a portion of the Logan Square branch on its way to O'Hare International Airport, as well as the Congress Line that replaced the Garfield Park Branch. The Douglas Park Branch, operated as a branch of the Blue Line from 1958 to 2008, is now operated as the Pink Line.

References

External links
 Metropolitan West Side Elevated Company System Map

Railway lines in Chicago
History of Chicago
Rapid transit in Illinois
Defunct Illinois railroads